A by-election was held for the New South Wales Legislative Assembly electorate of Wollongong-Kembla on 11 February 1950 because of the resignation of Billy Davies to successfully contest the federal seat of Cunningham at the 1949 election.

Dates

Result

Billy Davies resigned to successfully contest the 1949 election for Cunningham.

Aftermath
Baden Powell did not serve for long, losing pre-selection for the 1950 state election and retiring from politics.

See also
Electoral results for the district of Wollongong-Kembla
List of New South Wales state by-elections

References

1950 elections in Australia
New South Wales state by-elections
1950s in New South Wales